Twin Peaks is an unincorporated community in San Bernardino County, California, United States, located on California State Route 189  west-southwest of Lake Arrowhead. Twin Peaks has a post office with ZIP code 92391, which opened in 1916.

History 
Originally settled in the 1860s with many surrounding strawberry farms, the town would first be known as Strawberry Flat. Some of the first buildings to be constructed in the town include the now gone Squirrel Inn, the still-standing Antlers Inn, and the also still-standing Pine Rose Cabins. The Antlers Inn originated in 1919 when some 20 cabins were simultaneously constructed around a central lodge then known as the Alpine Terrace Resort.

Calvary Chapel Bible College 
In 1975, Calvary Chapel Bible College purchased and renovated the Monte Corona resort, repurposing it as a Biblical college and Conference Center. In 1994, C.C.B.C. would relocate to Murrieta, California before returning to Twin Peaks after nearly 30 years. The Bible College is currently undergoing major construction and creating more employment & investment for the community.

Church of Spiritual Technology
The Church of Scientology's Church of Spiritual Technology has been located in Twin Peaks since 1982.

Notable residents 
 Tim Donnelly - former California State Assemblyman and local businessman

Climate
According to the Köppen Climate Classification system, Twin Peaks has beautiful warm-summer Mediterranean climate.

References

Unincorporated communities in San Bernardino County, California
Unincorporated communities in California